The Revolt of the Slaves is a 1960 Italian film directed by Nunzio Malasomma. It is based on the 1854 novel Fabiola by Nicholas Wiseman.

Cast 
Rhonda Fleming: Claudia
Lang Jeffries: Vibio
Darío Moreno: Massimiano
Ettore Manni: Sebastiano
Wandisa Guida: Agnese
Gino Cervi: Claudio
Fernando Rey: Valerio
Serge Gainsbourg: Corvino
José Nieto: Sesto, servitore di Claudia 
Rainer Penkert: Massimo
Antonio Casas: Tertulio 
Dolores Francine: Liubaia

Release
The Revolt of the Slaves was released in Italy on 20 December 1960 with a 100-minute running time and in the United States with a 102-minute running time in June 1961. It was released in West Germany as Die Sklaven Roms on 17 March 1961.

See also
 List of Italian films of 1960

References

Bibliography

External links

1960 films
Peplum films
Spanish historical adventure films
West German films
Films directed by Nunzio Malasomma
Remakes of Italian films
Remakes of French films
Films set in the Roman Empire
Films set in the 4th century
Religious epic films
Films based on British novels
Sword and sandal films
1960s Italian films